Paweł Socha (born 13 August 1991) is a Polish professional footballer who plays as a goalkeeper for IV liga side Świdniczanka Świdnik. He formerly played for Korona Kielce, Stal Stalowa Wola, Górnik Łęczna, KS Lublinianka, Motor Lublin and Wisła Puławy.

Career
Socha began his career at Górnik Łęczna. After playing a few seasons at youth level for Korona Kielce, in February 2011, he joined Stal Stalowa Wola on loan, and he made his professional debut on 13 March 2011 in a 0–0 away draw against Puszcza Niepołomice. In the  summer of 2011 he moved to Górnik Łęczna.

In February 2016, Socha joined Motor Lublin on loan. He made thirteen appearances and conceded ten goals. In August 2016, he signed a contract with Motor. On 30 June 2017, Socha signed a one-year deal that included a mutual option for the 2018/2019 season.

On 30 July 2018, Socha signed with his former club Wisła Puławy.

References

External links
 

1991 births
Living people
Sportspeople from Lublin
Polish footballers
Association football goalkeepers
Korona Kielce players
Stal Stalowa Wola players
Górnik Łęczna players
KS Lublinianka players
Motor Lublin players
Wisła Puławy players
I liga players
II liga players
III liga players